Pedro Nolasco Martín José María de la Candelaria Francisco Javier Ampudia y Grimarest  (January 30, 1805 – August 7, 1868) was born in Havana, Cuba, and served Mexico as a Northern army officer for most of his life. At various points he was the governor of Tabasco, Yucatán, and Nuevo León. He also served a short term as Secretary of National Defense under President Benito Juárez.

Ampudia began his career in the Spanish army, and emigrated to Mexico following the Mexican War of Independence. In 1836, Ampudia served with the Mexican artillery at the Siege of the Alamo and later saw heavy combat at the Battle of San Jacinto. During border skirmishes with Texas in the early 1840s, Ampudia commanded the 350-man garrison of Ciudad Mier which was attacked on December 26, 1842, by Texan militia. In a bloody two-day battle, over 600 Mexicans were killed but they eventually forced the enemy to surrender, earning the grudging respect of the Texans across the border.

Briefly appointed as commander-in-chief of the Mexican Army of the North in 1846, Ampudia was removed from command following the brutal public execution of a local guerrilla leader on his personal orders. As a conservador (a member of Mexico's conservative faction), Ampudia was quickly relegated to a staff position in favor of his liberal rival, General Mariano Arista. At the Battle of Palo Alto, Ampudia harshly criticized Arista for what he saw as "unacceptable tactical blunders" and continued his criticism at the Battle of Resaca de la Palma – a defeat for which Arista partially blamed him.

During the long retreat south, Ampudia was appointed commander-in-chief of the Army of the North, in time to command Mexican forces at the Battle of Monterrey. Despite orders from Antonio López de Santa Anna that he was to retreat to Saltillo, Ampudia chose to stand at Monterrey instead and informed Santa Anna that:

"The men will brook no further retreat in the face of the enemy."

After a skilled defense of the city, Ampudia found American forces entered from the west and east. Trapped in the city plaza and bombarded by U.S. forces with howitzers, general Ampudia chose to request a flag of truce and retreat his battered army. His arrangement with Zachary Taylor allowed the Army of the North to keep its weapons but march as far south as possible and neglect offensive operations for three months.  At Saltillo, Ampudia attempted to throw up a defense similar to that at Monterrey, but the inhabitants of the city would have none of it. His failure to defend that city led to his removal by Santa Anna, and like his former superior, Arista, Ampudia found himself spending most of the rest of the war in administrative duties, though he was in command of portions of the Mexican artillery at the Battle of Buena Vista in 1847.

Despite his controversial retreat at Monterrey, Ampudia remained popular in Mexican folklore as "the only man who could defeat Taylor." After the war, Ampudia's policies became gradually more liberal, so that he supported the government of Benito Juárez during the Maximillian Intervention and served with considerable bravery and skill as commander of the liberal Army of the East, in whose command he was gravely wounded. In 1868, Ampudia died (possibly from complications arising from his wartime injuries) and was buried in the Panteón de San Fernando.

See also
 Battles of the Mexican–American War
 History of Mexico
 History of Nuevo León
 Mexican–American War

References
 Bauer, K. Jack, "The Mexican–American War, 1846–1848"
 Miguel Ángel Peral, ed., "Diccionario Biográfico Mexicano"

External links
 Pedro Ampudia at A Continent Divided: The U.S.-Mexico War, Center for Greater Southwestern Studies, the University of Texas at Arlington

1803 births
1868 deaths
People from Havana
People of Mexican side in the Texas Revolution
Mexican military personnel of the Mexican–American War
Cuban emigrants to Mexico
Governors of Nuevo León
People from Monterrey